Tatum is an English toponymic surname. It derived from Tatham, a parish in North Lancashire. Notable people with the surname include.

Art Tatum (1909–1956), American jazz pianist
Beverly Daniel Tatum (born 1954), American university president
Bradford Tatum (born 1965), American actor
Channing Tatum (born 1980), American actor
Charles "Chuck" Tatum (1926-2014), American World War II veteran
Donn Tatum (1913–1993), American president of Walt Disney

Edward Lawrie Tatum (1909-1975), American geneticist
Howell Tatum (died 1822), Justice of the Tennessee Supreme Court
J. Michael Tatum, American voice actor
Jack Tatum (1948-2010), American football player
Jayson Tatum (born 1998), American basketball player
Jim Tatum (1913–1959), American football and baseball coach
Jim Tatum (born 1967), American baseball player
John Tatum (disambiguation), multiple people
Johnny Tatum (died 1994), American rodeo clown
Kelvin Tatum (born 1964), Former British speedway rider
Kinnon Tatum (born 1975), American football player
Reece "Goose" Tatum (1921-1967), American basketball player
Robert Tatum (1891-1964), American mountain climber
Sandy Tatum (1920-2017), American lawyer and golf administrator

See also
Tatem (surname)
Tate (surname)